Gentiana bavarica, the Bavarian gentian, is a herbaceous perennial species of flowering plant in the Gentian family Gentianaceae.

Description
This plant forms a rosette of basal obovate to spathulate yellowish-green leaves, about 1 cm long. They bloom from July to August.

Distribution and habitat

References

Biolib
Alpine Plant Encyclopaedia
Luirig.altervista

bavarica
Flora of Germany
Plants described in 1753
Taxa named by Carl Linnaeus